Isametovo (İsämät) is a rural locality (a village) in Dmitriyevo-Polyansky Selsoviet, Sharansky District, Bashkortostan, Russia. The population was 2 as of 2010. There is 1 street.

Geography 
Isametovo is located 17 km west of Sharan (the district's administrative centre) by road. Karakulka is the nearest rural locality.

References 

Rural localities in Sharansky District